The 13th BET Awards were held at the Nokia Theatre L.A. Live in Los Angeles, California on June 30, 2013. The awards ceremony recognized Americans in music, movies, sports and other fields of entertainment over the past year. Comedian and actor Chris Tucker hosted the event for the first time. 

The BET Awards nominations were announced May 14, 2013 at a press conference on the rooftop of L.A.'s Icon Ultra Lounge, just up the street from the Nokia Theatre, where the BET Awards were staged for the first time. Chris Brown was announced as the first confirmed performer. Charlie Wilson was announced as this year's Cadillac Lifetime Achievement Award honoree. R. Kelly also performed at the awards show. The show was the culmination of the cable network's first ever BET Experience, a three-day music and lifestyle fest done in partnership with AEG Live. Chris Brown won the Fandemonium Award for the fourth time in a row, while Nicki Minaj won Best Female Hip-Hop Artist, making history as the first female rapper to win the award four times consecutively.Chief Keef won the award of break out song with “Love Sosa,” as well as break out artist of the year. The Young Stars award winner was awarded to Gabrielle Douglas, gold medalist in the 2012 London Summer Olympics. The show opened with a performance by Chris Brown and Nicki Minaj performing Love More.

Nominations
Announcing the nominations were Tamar Braxton and Kendrick Lamar each of whom also received nominations. Drake lead with 12 nods, followed by Lamar and 2 Chainz tied with eight nods. A$AP Rocky had five with Jay-Z, while Justin Timberlake and Miguel tied with four. Drake was nominated five times for the top prize, Video of the Year. His hit single "Started from the Bottom" and "HYFR" competed with his collaborations with 2 Chainz ("No Lie"), Kendrick Lamar ("Poetic Justice"), and A$AP Rocky ("Problems"). The Video of the Year award had 10 nominees for the first time ever, including Justin Timberlake's "Suit & Tie", Kanye West's "Mercy", Miguel's "Adorn", Rihanna's "Diamonds" and Macklemore's & Ryan Lewis' "Thrift Shop".

With her eighth nomination, Beyoncé tied Mary J. Blige for the most nominations received for Best Female R&B Artist.

BET Experience
A three-day festival called the BET Experience, BET revealed a deal with Anschutz Entertainment Group that would bring the show to the $2.5-billion L.A. Live complex in 2013. "It allows us to take the show to the next level," said Debra Lee, chairman and chief executive of BET. "We are making more opportunities for advertisers and taking it to a level that can get more consumers involved. In addition to concerts, comedy shows and the new home of the BET Awards, the BET Experience 3-day weekend featured "106 & Park" LIVE, BET Fan Fest, film screenings, BET Revealed seminars, BET GRAMMY® Museum exhibit, various social events and celebrity appearances. BET Experience teamed with the BET Awards broadcasting live from Nokia Theatre L.A. Live on June 30, 2013.

Winners and nominees

Presenters
 Jamie Foxx
 Angela Bassett
 Gabrielle Union
 Wayne Brady
 Paula Patton
 La La Anthony
 Taraji P. Henson
 Lauren London
 Morris Chestnut
 Nelly
 Nia Long
 Nick Cannon
 Queen Latifah
 Sanaa Lathan
 Terrence Howard
 Terrence Jenkins
 Trey Songz
 Brandy
 Quvenzhané Wallis
 Boris Kodjoe
 Bobby Brown
 Don Cheadle
 Derek Luke
 Kevin Hart
 Duane Martin
 Cedric the Entertainer
 Gabrielle Douglas
 J. B. Smoove
 Forest Whitaker

Performers

106 & Park Pre-Show
 Young Marqus
 Jacob Latimore
 Ace Hood
 Trinidad James
 French Montana
 Schoolboy Q
 Problem
 K.Michelle

Main Show
 Chris Brown - "Fine China" / "Don't Think They Know" / "Love More" (with Nicki Minaj)
 Robin Thicke - "Blurred Lines" (with Pharrell Williams and T.I.)
 Kendrick Lamar - "m.A.A.d city" / "Bitch, Don't Kill My Vibe" (with Erykah Badu)
 R. Kelly - A medley of R. Kelly's greatest songs, including "When a Woman's Fed Up", "Bump n' Grind", "Ignition", "I Wish", and snippet of "My Story (R. Kelly song)" 
 Mariah Carey - "#Beautiful" (with Miguel and Young Jeezy)
Young Jeezy - "R.I.P"
Miguel - "How Many Drinks?" (with Kendrick Lamar)
 India.Arie - "There Goes My Baby", a tribute to Charlie Wilson
 Jamie Foxx - "Yearning for Your Love", a tribute to Charlie Wilson
Justin Timberlake - "Charlie, Last Name, Wilson", a tribute to Charlie Wilson
 Stevie Wonder - "Burn Rubber on Me (Why You Wanna Hurt Me)", a tribute to Charlie Wilson
Charlie Wilson - "You Are"
 Snoop Dogg - "Beautiful" (with Charlie Wilson and Pharrell Williams)
Snoop Dogg - "Signs" with Charlie Wilson and Justin Timberlake
Charlie Wilson - "You Dropped a Bomb on Me" (with Justin Timberlake and Snoop Dogg)
Charlie Wilson - "Outstanding" (with Pharrell Williams, Justin Timberlake, and Snoop Dogg)
 J. Cole - "Crooked Smile" / "Power Trip" (with Miguel)
 Tamela Mann - "Take Me To The King" with Kirk Franklin
 Ciara - "I'm Out" (with Nicki Minaj) / "Body Party"
 Dawn Penn - "You Don't Love Me (No, No, No)" 
 Chaka Demus & Pliers - "Murder She Wrote" (with Elephant Man)
 Beenie Man - "Who Am I (Sim Simma)" (with Elephant Man)
Elephant Man - "Pon De River" (with Beenie Man)
 2 Chainz - "Feds Watching"
 A$AP Rocky - "Problems" (with 2 Chainz and Kendrick Lamar)
 Janelle Monáe - "Q.U.E.E.N." (with Erykah Badu)

External links
Official Site

BET Awards
2013 music awards